Pellicia is a genus of skippers in the family Hesperiidae.

Species
Pellicia angra Evans, 1953
Pellicia arina Evans, 1953
Pellicia costimacula Herrich-Schäffer, 1870
Pellicia demetrius (Plötz, 1882)
Pellicia dimidiata Herrich-Schäffer, 1870
Pellicia hersilia Hayward, [1940]
Pellicia klugi Williams & Bell, 1939
Pellicia najoides Hayward, 1933
Pellicia ranta Evans, 1953
Pellicia santana Williams & Bell, 1939
Pellicia simulator Williams & Bell, 1939
Pellicia theon Plötz, 1882
Pellicia tonga Evans, 1953
Pellicia trax Evans, 1953
Pellicia tyana Plötz, 1882
Pellicia vecina Schaus, 1902

References
Natural History Museum Lepidoptera genus database
Pellicia at funet

Carcharodini
Hesperiidae genera
Taxa named by Gottlieb August Wilhelm Herrich-Schäffer